The Xinwu Rice Story House is a gallery in Xinwu District, Taoyuan City, Taiwan.

History
The gallery was originally part of seven warehouses and processing plants built by the Japanese government in 1939 to store rice harvested from around the area. Restoration work of the building completed in November 2006 and it was opened in 2007 by Hakka Affairs Council and Taoyuan County Government.

Architecture
The building was built with bricks with walls made of adobe and rice hulls covered with mortar. There is a measurement mark indicating the rice volume stored inside the warehouse. The roofs use Japanese tiles and decorated with animal pictures.

See also
 List of tourist attractions in Taiwan

References

2007 establishments in Taiwan
Industrial buildings completed in 1939
Tourist attractions in Taoyuan City
Warehouses in Taiwan